Lidiia Hunko (born August 10, 1993, in Ivano-Frankivsk, Ukraine) is a Ukrainian bobsledder. She is the first Ukrainian female bobsledder who received a quota place for the Winter Olympics.

Career

Hunko started her sporting career as a strongwomen. She became a World Champion in deadlift in 2016. The next year, she won "Arnold Classic" in her category.

Hunko took up bobsleigh in 2018, and one year later she started to compete internationally. Her first international start took place on November 20, 2019, in Lillehammer, Norway.

On December 20, 2020, she won together with Iryna Lishchynska a bronze medal at the European Cup stage in Sigulda which became the first-ever medal in the history of Ukrainian bobsleigh. They repeted their success on November 27, 2021, when they again won a bronze medal at the European Cup stage in Altenberg.

On January 14, 2022, Hunko was third in a World Monobob Series event in Winterberg. This result guaranteed her an Olympic spot. She became therefore the first Ukrainian female bobsledder to represent Ukraine at the Winter Games. She also ranked second together with Lishchynska in final two-women European Cup rating.

Hunko participated in the monobob event at the Winter Games in Beijing. After the competition, she failed a doping test and was suspended on 15 February.

Career results

Winter Olympics

World championships

Women's Monobob World Series

Rankings

Podiums

European Cup

Podiums in two-woman events

References

External links
 Hunko's profile at the webpage of the IBSF
 Hunko's Instagram account

1993 births
Living people
Ukrainian female bobsledders
Sportspeople from Ivano-Frankivsk
Bobsledders at the 2022 Winter Olympics
Olympic bobsledders of Ukraine
Doping cases in bobsleigh